Xviça Biçinaşvili (born 28 January 1974) is an Azerbaijani wrestler. He competed in the men's Greco-Roman 76 kg at the 2000 Summer Olympics.

References

External links
 

1974 births
Living people
Azerbaijani male sport wrestlers
Olympic wrestlers of Azerbaijan
Wrestlers at the 2000 Summer Olympics
Place of birth missing (living people)